Newfane may refer to several places in the United States:

 Newfane (town), New York
 Newfane (CDP), New York, a census-designated place in the town
 Newfane, Vermont, a town
 Newfane (village), Vermont, in the town
 New Fane, Wisconsin